The Jaguarão microregion is a microregion in the southern part of the state of Rio Grande do Sul, Brazil. Its total area is 6,331.228 km².

Municipalities 
The microregion consists of the following municipalities:
Arroio Grande
Herval
Jaguarão

References

Microregions of Rio Grande do Sul